František Kupka (23 September 1871 – 24 June 1957), also known as Frank Kupka or François Kupka, was a Czech painter and graphic artist. He was a pioneer and co-founder of the early phases of the abstract art movement and Orphic Cubism (Orphism).
Kupka's abstract works arose from a base of realism, but later evolved into pure abstract art.

Biography

Education
František Kupka was born in Opočno (eastern Bohemia) in Austria-Hungary in 1871. From 1889 to 1892, he studied at the Academy of Fine Arts in Prague. At this time, he painted historical and patriotic themes. Kupka enrolled at the Academy of Fine Arts in Vienna, where he concentrated on symbolic and allegorical subjects. He was influenced by the painter and social reformer Karl Wilhelm Diefenbach (1851–1913) and his naturistic life-style. Kupka exhibited at the Kunstverein, Vienna, in 1894. His involvement with theosophy and Eastern philosophy dates from this period. By spring 1894, Kupka had settled in Paris; there he attended the Académie Julian briefly and then studied with Jean-Pierre Laurens at the École des Beaux-Arts.

World War I
Kupka served as a volunteer in the First World War, and is mentioned in La Main coupée by Blaise Cendrars.
Cendrars describes him as a "proud soldier, calm, placid, strong", but really too old to be a soldier, being at least 25 years older than the rest.  When the regiment set out from Paris for the front in Picardy (they marched all the way on foot) Mme Kupka met the column as they arrived at the La Défense roundabout, near where they lived. She marched with them, carrying her husband's bag and his rifle.  She would have marched all the way to the front, but at the end of the first day the colonel had her arrested and sent back to Paris.  She later made her way to the front lines to spend time with her husband.  Kupka himself left the front due to frostbite in the foot, caused by nights in the trenches waist-deep in freezing water.

Career

Kupka worked as an illustrator of books and posters and, during his early years in Paris, became known for his satirical drawings for newspapers and magazines. In 1906, he settled in Puteaux, a suburb of Paris, and the same year exhibited for the first time at the Salon d'Automne. Kupka was deeply impressed by the first Futurist Manifesto, published in 1909 in Le Figaro. Kupka's 1909 painting Piano Keyboard/Lake marked a break in his representational style. His work became increasingly abstract around 1910–11, reflecting his theories of motion, color, and the relationship between music and painting (orphism). In 1911, he attended meetings of the Puteaux Group (Section d'Or). In 1912, he exhibited his Amorpha. Fugue à deux couleurs, at the Salon des Indépendants in the Cubist room, although he did not wish to be identified with any movement. Creation in the Plastic Arts, a book Kupka completed in 1913, was published in Prague in 1923.

In 1931, he was a founding member of Abstraction-Création. In 1936, his work was included in the exhibition Cubism and Abstract Art at the Museum of Modern Art in New York City, and in an important show with another Czech painter, Alphonse Mucha, at the Jeu de Paume in Paris. A retrospective of his work took place at the Galerie Mánes in Prague in 1946. The same year, Kupka participated in the Salon des Réalités Nouvelles, where he continued to exhibit regularly until his death. During the early 1950s, he gained general recognition and had several solo shows in New York.

Between 1919 and 1938 Kupka was financially supported by his good friend, art collector and industrialist Jindřich Waldes who accumulated a substantial collection of his art. Kupka died in 1957 in Puteaux, France.

Work
Kupka had a strong interest in color theory and freeing colors from descriptive associations (which is thought to have possibly influenced other artists like Robert Delaunay). Margit Rowell described his painting The Yellow Scale (c. 1907) as "Kupka's first attempt to come to terms with color theory in which the result is both personal and successful". Although a self-portrait, the subject of the painting was the color yellow. Around 1910 he began developing his own color wheels, adapting a format previously explored by Sir Isaac Newton and Hermann von Helmholtz. This work in turn led Kupka to execute a series of paintings he called "Discs of Newton" (1911–12).

 Planes by Colors
 The Colored One
 Reminiscence of a Cathedral
 Blue Space

Works in Peggy Guggenheim Collection, Venice, Italy:
 Study for Woman Picking Flowers (Femme cueillant des fleurs), ca 1910
 Study for Amorpha, Warm Chromatics, Chromatique chaude and for Fugue in Two Colors (Fugue a deux couleurs), ca 1911-1912
 Vertical Planes (Plans verticaux), 1911–1912
 Study for Organization of Graphic Motifs I (Localisations de mobiles graphiques I), ca 1911-12
 Around a point (Autour d'un point), ca 1920–1925

Other works include The Cathedral (Katedrála).

In March 2021, Kupka's Le Jaillissement II sold for GBP 7,551,600 in an auction organized by Sotheby's, so far the highest price for his work.

Personal life

Kupka was a vegetarian and took interest in theosophy. He practiced as a spiritualist medium and was alleged to have experienced clairvoyant trances. He was a believer in thought-forms which influenced his artwork. His theosophic visions inspired his painting Disks of Newton (Study for "Fugue in Two Colors"). He also practiced naturism.

See also 

 Kupka and Theosophy

Notes and references

 
 Kupka, František. La Création dans Les Arts Plastiques. Paris, 1923; edited and translated E. Abrams, 1989.
 
 Kupka, František. La Création dans Les Arts Plastiques. Paris, 1923; edited and translated E. Abrams, 1989.

External links

 
 Frantisek Kupka WikiPaintings 
 Frantisek Kupka  Centre Pompidou 
 
 Links to Kupka's works Artcyclopedia 
 The Athenaeum  List and images of Kupka's works
 Permanent exhibition of Waldes collection of František Kupka Museum Kampa, Prague
 The Yellow Scale Museum of Fine Arts, Houston
 Museum magical Arts   - principle which appears in nature, architecture, and mathematics.
 Art - Nouveau, The Athenaeum  Private Collection

Abstract painters
Czech graphic designers
Orphism (art)
People from Opočno
1871 births
1957 deaths
Academy of Fine Arts, Prague alumni
Recipients of the Legion of Honour
20th-century Czech painters
20th-century male artists
Czech male painters
Cubist artists
Theosophists